Kevin Michael Scanlan (29 September 1909 – 19 July 1996) was an Australian rules footballer who played with Footscray in the Victorian Football League (VFL).

Notes

External links 

1909 births
1996 deaths
Australian rules footballers from Victoria (Australia)
Western Bulldogs players